{{Infobox cultivar
| name = ''Mangifera' 'Bennet Alphonso'
| image = Mango_BennetAlphonso_Asit_fs.jpg
| image_caption = Unripe Bennet Alphonso mango
| genus = Mangifera''
| species = Mangifera indica| cultivar = 'Bennet Alphonso'
}}
The 'Bennet Alphonso' mango''' is a mango cultivar, daughter of the Alphonso, the premier mango of India. The Bennet Alphonso however, had limited success on the soils of Florida.

See also 
 List of mango cultivars

References 

Mango cultivars
Flora of Florida